Avalanche Mountain, is a  mountain summit located in Glacier National Park in the Selkirk Mountains in British Columbia, Canada. Its nearest higher peak is Mount Macdonald,  to the north. The Avalanche Glacier is situated on the east side of the peak, and the Connaught Tunnel lies partially beneath Avalanche Mountain. The peak is visible from eastbound Highway 1, the Trans-Canada Highway approaching Rogers Pass. During winter and spring of each year the western slope, named Avalanche Crest, generates avalanches which can threaten the highway.

History

The mountain's name was applied by Major A.B. Rogers and stems from its history of avalanches from its western slopes onto Rogers Pass. The 1910 Rogers Pass avalanche, the deadliest avalanche in Canadian history, resulted in the deaths of 62 Canadian Pacific Railway workers and was the impetus which forced the railway to build the Connaught Tunnel.

In 1881 Rogers and some of his party climbed to the crest of the ridge between Avalanche and Mount Macdonald, and may have climbed Avalanche itself. The first confirmed ascent of the mountain was made in 1885 by John Macoun and James M. Macoun.

The mountain's name was officially adopted in 1931 when approved by the Geographical Names Board of Canada.

Climate

Based on the Köppen climate classification, Avalanche Mountain is located in a subarctic climate zone with cold, snowy winters, and mild summers. Temperatures can drop below −20 °C with wind chill factors below −30 °C. Precipitation runoff from the mountain drains west into the Illecillewaet River, or east into the Beaver River.

See also

Geography of British Columbia

References

Gallery

External links
 Flickr photo: Avalanche Mountain from east, with Avalanche Glacier
 Weather: Avalanche Mountain

Two-thousanders of British Columbia
Selkirk Mountains
Glacier National Park (Canada)
Kootenay Land District